Pure Gold Jewellers is a jewellery retailer with 120 stores across the Middle East, in the UAE, Oman, Kuwait, Qatar, Jordan, KSA, Bahrain, Sri Lanka and 200 stores in India. The company's stores sell a variety of jewellery in diamonds, gold, platinum, Murano glass and precious stones. 
Founded by Indian expatriate Firoz Merchant in 1989, the first Pure Gold Jewellers store was established in Dubai. Merchant has focused on gradual expansion of the brand's retail network. The company entered the Indian market in 2010, and has plans to open 200 stores in the country in the next few years. Pure Gold are the sole concessionaire for retail of gold and diamond jewellery at Abu Dhabi Duty Free (terminals I, II, and III), Kuwait Duty Free and Muscat Duty Free. Pure Gold Jewellers employs more than 1000 retail staff across the globe and also owns two jewellery manufacturing factories in India and in China, employing over 1,500 workers.

Awards
Pure Gold Jewellers is a recipient of the "Best Service Performance Brand" award in the large business category for five years - 2007-2008, 2008–2009, 2009–2010, 2011-2012, 2012-2013 and 2014-2015 under the Dubai Service Excellence Scheme (DSES) of the Dubai Department of Economic Development, making it the only company to have won it five times. The company also topped in the ‘Best Customer Service’ category in the UAE jewellery sector in an annual study by international consultancy Ethos Consultancy for the year 2009 and 2010.

About the founder

Firoz Merchant, the founder and chairman of Pure Gold Group, was born in India. He moved to Dubai in 1989 and set up his own gold and diamonds trading business under the brand name Pure Gold Jewellers.
Merchant is a visible presence in the large Indian diaspora in the UAE. He has been involved in a number of philanthropic activities that have provided help and support for various communities. Merchant is a well-known business leader in the Middle East and widely quoted in the press. He is ranked No.26 on the Forbes Middle East List of Indian Owners 2014. Arabian Business placed him at No.28 on its 2014 Richest Indians in the GCC list with an estimated net worth of US$435 million. He is also a board member of Dubai Diamond Exchange (DDE) and a member of Dubai Gold & Jewellery Group.

Corporate social responsibility
Pure Gold Jewellers' corporate social responsibility has been focused on philanthropy, in conjunction with the UAE government. Organisations that have benefited from the company's CSR policies include the Red Crescent Society, the Sheikh Mohammed Bin Rashid Al Maktoum Charitable Trust, Bait-ul-Khair, the UAE's Education Ministry and the Health Ministry, among many others. Firoz Merchant has also contributed towards Corrective Institutions in order to release prisoners belonging to various nationalities jailed in the UAE. As a kind gesture, Merchant has decided to spend 1 million US dollars (3.8 million dirhams) to help free prisoners who are behind bars in UAE due to non-payment of debts. He has already paid 150,000 dirhams for the release of 132 prisoners from Ajman Central jail. He will pay the remaining amount to secure the release of more prisoners.

Notes

External links 
 
Wingold Next

Jewellery retailers of the United Arab Emirates
Jewellery retailers of India
Companies based in Dubai
Retail companies established in 1989
Gold in India
Privately held companies of the United Arab Emirates
Emirati companies established in 1989